Tie Vapauteen (Finnish for "Road to Freedom") is an album by the Finnish rapper Paleface and the band Laulava unioni (Paleface and the Singing Union), released in Finland at the end of November, 2019. It contains newly recorded versions of American Finnish industrial folk music songs.

Background
The Industrial Workers of the World (IWW), an anarchistic trade union in the United States and Canada, had a strong singing tradition, and many of its American Finnish communities also had songs in Finnish. These songs had all but been forgotten, when musicologist Saijaleena Rantanen found three Finnish language IWW songbooks in the Immigration History and Research Center archive in Minneapolis and at the Lakehead University archive in Thunder Bay, Canada. Of these three books, only one had a known copy in Finland, whereas of the two others, only individual pages had remained. The songs had last been heard possibly a hundred years previously at the American Finn halls.

The songbooks only contained the words of the songs, no sheet music. Finding the melodies took some deduction and detective work. It was easy to connect the song Solidaarisuutta aina to an English song called Solidarity Forever, but the melody of the song Langenneen laulun (‘the song of the fallen woman’) was more difficult to find. In the end, Rantanen found the sheet music of this song for the piano at the Library of Congress in Washington D.C. The authors of many of the texts are unknown, as the authors would have been likely to have been faced with discrimination at their work places.

The IWW grew in popularity in the 1910s. The Finns called the members of this union with the word “tuplajuulaiset” (‘double U folks’). Finns constituted the biggest ethnic segment of this union and they were also the most active members. The circulation of their magazine, the Industrialisti was 10,000 copies. Many of the IWW members knew little or no English, so it was natural for the union to produce songs in the Finnish language. The melodies of these songs were in many cases familiar to the Finns, and it was easy for them to learn the new words to them. The melodies came from here and there, e.g. from Oskar Merikanto, and the Swedish American Joe Hill, whose real name was Joel Hägglund. One melody was taken from the song The Battle Hymn of the Republic, and others were taken from the theater and from folk music.

Rantanen told of her finds to music producer and connoisseur of working class folk music Timo “Tipi” Tuovinen, and together they continued the detective work. Some four decades earlier, in the late 1970s, Tuovinen had collected anti-church American Finnish music, and he was planning to release a record of it, but the bankruptcy of Love Records put and end to those plans. In the 1980s, the Finnish record companies were not interested in such themes.

The next thing to happen was that Tuovinen suggested to the rap artist Paleface that they should put together a band that would play the Finnish IWW songs. Paleface had earlier performed songs by Hiski Salomaa and Joe Hill, it did not take much persuasion to get him on the band wagon. The third member to join the group was Ossi Peura, and now they had a core of a band that could sing harmonies. After this accordionist Harri Kuusijärvi and drummer Anssi Nykänen joined the band. Tuovinen and Peura arranged the songs, with their previous expertise of the music genres of the times, but the use of imagination also played a part, as it had done with the American Finns of the time.

The name Laulava unioni (‘The Singing Union’) was chosen for the band, as that is what the IWW was also called in America.

On the songs of the record
The music for the song Pontevat mahat was composed by Oskar Merikanto, and the original is the provincial song of Lapland and North Ostrobothnia. Also the music in Hoopon laulu (‘The Hobo Song’) was by Merikanto, the original being called Tula tuulan tuli tuli tei!

The melody for Siispä laulakaa (‘Sing, therefore’) was taken from the song “My Old Kentucky Home”, whereas that of Säälikää herroja (‘Have mercy on the fine gentlemen’) is from an old Methodist hymn. Also the melody for Karvajalka is from a hymn called Sunlight, Sunlight. In Kirkkopotpuri (‘Church Potpourri’) the melodies of a German youth song and the Swedish birthday song Ja må han leva are combined.

The band had to exercise some artistic freedom, as the W folks’ songs often had a great many verses, even up to 40 of them, and it is not possible to perform such songs in their entirety today.

Many of the songs are in major scale, which gives them a joyous feeling, and included are also some rowdy ditties making fun of this or that.

Track listing

Musicians
Paleface, vocals and acoustic guitar
Tipi Tuovinen, double bass
Ossi Peura, charango
Harri Kuusijärvi, accordion
Anssi Nykänen, drums

Visitors
Helsinki workers association women's choir Elegia, conducted by Anna Karjula (tracks 3, 7, 8, 9), soloist on track 9: Kaisu Säynevirta
Janne Toivonen, trumpet and cornet (tracks 1, 10, 12)
Antti Hynninen, flute and alto saxophone (tracks 1, 10, 12)
Juho Viljanen, trombone and tuba (tracks 1, 10, 12)
Miihkali Jaatinen, banjo and banjo arrangement (tracks 2, 3, 4, 10, 11)

Production
Producer: Tipi Tuovinen
Engineering, mixing and mastering: Kari Laaksonen
Studio: Raja-Audio Studio, Meriniitty, Salo (Naiskuoro Elegia, perkussios, banjo and some vocals: Cold Creek Recording Studios, Vantaa; horns: Vintage Music Corner, Vantaa; grand piano: Kallio-Kuninkala, Vantaa)
Cover: Karri Miettinen & Jani Tolin on the basis of the cover of the American Finnish Tie Vapauteen magazine cover of November 1930
Layout and design: Jani Tolin

References

External links
Paleface ja Laulava Unioni herättivät henkiin amerikansuomalaisten protestilaulut sadan vuoden takaa The Yle article on the record by Paleface and the Singing Union (in Finnish).

Paleface (Finnish musician)
2019 albums
Finnish-American culture
Finnish
Industrial Workers of the World culture
Trade union songs
Finnish-American culture in Michigan
Finnish-Canadian culture